Deh Now is a village in Ziarat Rural District, in the Central District of Dashtestan County, Bushehr Province, Iran. At the 2006 census, its population was 176, in 39 families.

References 

Populated places in Dashtestan County